Etheria is a genus of freshwater oysters in the Etheriidae family of mollusk bivalves, and a part of the Unionida order. The genus includes a single species, Etheria elliptica, that is found throughout Africa and Madagascar.

Etheria elliptica was first described by Lamarck in 1807, and lives in river basins along the Nile, Lake Tanganyika and Lake Victoria, and in Chad, Zaire, Niger, Senegal, and Angola.

Etheria are found as fossils at paleontological sites in Africa, including at Lake Turkana 3-5 million years ago. It first appears in the Miocene in northeast Zaire.

References

Etheriidae
Bivalves described in 1807
Monotypic mollusc genera